Frank Morley (September 9, 1860 – October 17, 1937) was a leading mathematician, known mostly for his teaching and research in the fields of algebra and geometry. Among his mathematical accomplishments was the discovery and proof of the celebrated Morley's trisector theorem in elementary plane geometry.
He led 50 Ph.D.'s to their degrees, and was said to be:
"...one of the more striking figures of the relatively small group of men who initiated that development which, within his own lifetime, brought Mathematics in America from a minor position to its present place in the sun."

Life
Morley was born in the town of Woodbridge in Suffolk, England. His parents were Elizabeth Muskett and Joseph Roberts Morley, Quakers who ran a china shop. After being educated at Woodbridge School, Morley went on to King's College, Cambridge (B.A., 1884).

In 1887, Morley  moved to Pennsylvania. He taught at Haverford College until 1900, when he became chairman of the mathematics department at Johns Hopkins University. His publications include Elementary Treatise on the Theory of Functions (1893), with James Harkness; and Introduction to the Theory of Analytic Functions (1898). He was President of the American Mathematical Society from 1919 to 1920 and was the editor of the American Journal of Mathematics from 1900 to 1921. He was an invited speaker at the International Congress of Mathematicians in 1912 at Cambridge (England), in 1924 at Toronto, and in 1936 at Oslo.

In 1933 he and his son Frank Vigor Morley published the "stimulating volume", Inversive Geometry. The book develops complex numbers as a tool for geometry and function theory. Some non-standard terminology is used such as "base-circle" for unit circle and "turn" for a point on it.

He was a strong chess player and once beat world champion Emanuel Lasker in a game of chess.

He died in Baltimore, Maryland at age 77.

His three sons are novelist Christopher Morley, Pulitzer Prize winner Felix Morley, and Frank Vigor Morley, also a mathematician.

Works
 1893: (with James Harkness) A treatise on the theory of functions  (New York: Macmillan)
 1898: (with James Harkness) Introduction to the Theory of Analytic Functions (G.E.Stechert And Company)
 1919: On the Lüroth Quartic Curve
 1933: (with son Frank Vigor Morley) Inversive Geometry, Ginn & Co., now available from HathiTrust

See also
cis
Turn
Lüroth quartic
Morley centers
Petersen–Morley theorem

References

 R.C. Archibald, A Semicentennial History of the American Mathematical Society (1888–1938), Chapter 15: The Presidents: #15 Morley 1919–20. pp. 194–201, includes bibliography of Morley's papers.

External links
 
 
 
 Clark Kimberling: Frank Morley (1860–1937) geometer.

1860 births
1937 deaths
19th-century British mathematicians
19th-century American mathematicians
20th-century American mathematicians
British expatriates in the United States
British geometers
Johns Hopkins University faculty
Haverford College faculty
Presidents of the American Mathematical Society
Alumni of King's College, Cambridge
People educated at Woodbridge School
People from Woodbridge, Suffolk